Georgia State Route 1 Spur may refer to:

 Georgia State Route 1 Spur (Columbus 1946–1969): a former spur route of State Route 1 that existed in Columbus
 Georgia State Route 1 Spur (Columbus 1963–1988): a former spur route of State Route 1 that existed in Columbus
 Georgia State Route 1 Spur (Floyd County): a former spur route of State Route 1 that existed in Floyd County
 Georgia State Route 1 Spur (LaGrange): a former spur route of State Route 1 that existed in LaGrange
 Georgia State Route 1 Spur (Rome): a former spur route of State Route 1 that existed in Rome

0001 Spur